Eduardo Aunós Pérez (8 September 1894 – 25 September 1967) was a Spanish politician who served as Minister of Justice of Spain between 1943 and 1945, during the Francoist dictatorship.

References

1894 births
1967 deaths
Justice ministers of Spain
Government ministers during the Francoist dictatorship